Gustavo Gac-Artigas is a Chilean American writer, playwright, actor, theater director and editor. Born in Santiago, Chile, he has lived in New Jersey since 1995. He is a correspondent member of the North American Academy of the Spanish Language (Academia Norteamericana de la Lengua Española-ANLE).

His poetry has been translated into English and French and published in academic literary magazines such as the Revista de la Academia Norteamericana de la Lengua Española (RANLE)https://www.ranle.us/numeros/volumen-7/numero-14/gustavo-gac-artigas/, the Latino Book Review, Multicultural Echoes Literary Magazine (California State University in Chico)https://www.csuchico.edu/illc/publications/me.shtml, Enclave, Revista de Creación Literaria en Español (the City University of New York-CUNY), and in cultural magazines ViceVersa , Letralia, Todoliteratura, The Chesterton Review, Nueva York Poetry Review, Cronopios, Kametsa, Nagari y Terre à Ciel .

It has also been included in numerous anthologies such as Segunda antología poética de la Feria Internacional del Libro de Nueva York, 2022, Antología poética LACUHE 2022, Boundless 2022: Anthology of the Valle del Rio Grande International Poetry Festival y Multilingual Anthology (The Americas Poetry Festival of New York 2019, 2021, 2022).

His most recent publications are two poetry collections: 1. a bilingual collection: hombre de américa/ man of the americas (Nueva York Poetry Press 2022, translated by Andrea Labinger and Priscilla Gac-Artigas) and 2. a trilingual collection: deseos   longings   j'aimerais tant (Ediciones Nuevo Espacio 2020, Translated by Andrea Labinger, English and Priscilla Gac-Artigas and Ada Mondès, French) 

He is a regular op-ed contributor to Agencia Efe, Le Monde diplomatique, Edición Chile , impactolatino.com  since 2015.

Art Without Borders-The Gac-Artigas Foundation
With his wife Priscilla Gac-Artigas, PhD, Fulbright Scholar, Full member of the North American Academy of the Spanish Language (Academia Norteamericana de la Lengua Española-ANLE). and Professor of Latin American literature at Monmouth University, NJ he is the owner and curator of the exhibit “Memorias, geografía de una década: Chile 1973-1983”/ “Memories, Geography of a Decade: Chile 1973-1983.”

The exhibit consists of 45 original prints (24 of them numbered); 25 original posters; 50 pictures of the 1973 coup; and 25 photos of performances by Théâtre de la Résistance-Chili, a Chilean theater group in exile in Paris after the coup. Prints are by 3 National Art Award winners: José Balmes, Guillermo Núñez, & Gracia Barrios, and by Alejandro Marcos, Ernest Pignon-Ernest, and Eduardo Berroeta; posters, which retrace a decade of cultural solidarity events in Europe, by renowned artists v.g. Miró & Ottaviano; photos of the coup are by former Gamma news agency journalists; and TRCh theater pictures are professional photos showing the evolution of a theater group forced to create in exile.

Memorias has been hosted by the University of Pennsylvania (UPenn), Instituto Cervantes in NY, Bowdoin College, and Monmouth University, in NJ.

Biography
In 1968 Gac-Artigas traveled to Bulgaria to participate in the Democratic Youth World Festival and to Czechoslovakia invited by the government of the time to observe the changes introduced during the Prague Spring. Upon his return to Chile, he dropped out of college and embarked on a trip through Latin America performing in different countries with a documentary theater play called Poetry Mail which included poems by established writers, local writers and songs intertwined with current events from national and local newspapers. With Poetry Mail, Gac-Artigas traversed South America from his native Chile to Bogota, Colombia. In Colombia he worked with Enrique Buenaventura and Santiago Garcia and the Teatro La Candelaria in Bogotá.

In 1971 he returned to Chile where he founded and directed the experimental Theatre del Cobre (TEC) in the Cultural House of El Teniente copper mine during the government of Salvador Allende. 
TEC's last performance in Chile was at the Chuquicamata mine, in the northern part of the country with the play Freedom, Freedom, an adaptation by Gac-Artigas of Flavio Rengel’s play about a group opposed to the 1973 coup d'état. The presentation began on September 10, 1973 and ended with a forum attended by David Baytelman, manager of the mine, mineworkers, and some political leaders on September 11, day in which the group was supposed to continue their tour to present the play for the workers of the nitrate mine.

Gac-Artigas was arrested on September 11 in the afternoon, and three days later led to Rancagua, 2,000 kilometers south, where he was imprisoned in the public jail as political prisoner number 3245 on the list prepared by the Chilean National Institute of Human Rights. He was interrogated for three days, “with haste”—as the military used to call torture—by a lieutenant named Medina. Months later he was out of jail thanks to the intervention of the UN and was taken to Santiago where, with a deportation order, and a travel document issued by the Red Cross, he left the country for exile in Paris. There, along with Colombian actress Perla Valencia, he founded the group Théâtre de la Résistance-Chili (then Nuevo Teatro Los Comediantes) with which he toured the stages of Europe and participated in major international festivals such as: Nancy, Avignon, Ljubljana, Hammamet, Djendouba, Tabarka, Hammam Lift, Yverdon, Bern, Zurich and Stagedoor Festival among others.

In 1984 he tried to return to Chile, but on September 5 of that year his name appeared on a list of about 5,000 people forbidden from entering the country for representing “a danger to the internal security of the State”. This failed attempt forced him to wander, with his group, through Latin America, from Buenos Aires to Bogota crossing through Bolivia, Peru and Ecuador. He remained with his group in Colombia for one year performing in different parts of the country. After a hunger strike, he was sent back to Europe, to Rotterdam, and not Paris, because after one year out of France he had lost his political refugee status in that country. Between 1986 and 1989 he lived in the Netherlands, where he continued his theater work and with his group he participated in the Stagedoor Festival (1986) and the Latino Festival of Utrecht (1989). In 1989 he received the “Poetry Park Award” for his story “Dr. Zamenhofstraat.”

In 2018 his novel Y todos éramos actores, un siglo de luz y sombra [And All of Us Were Actors, A Century Of Light And Shadow] (2016)  English edition translated by Andrea G. Labinger was second runner up of the ILBA (International Latino Book Award 2018) in the category Best Fiction Book in Translation - Spanish to English.

Since 1991, Gac-Artigas has lived in the United States. In 1992 he was invited by the theater department of Texas Christian University as artist in residence to direct his work Discoverings.

He currently resides in New Jersey where he continues his literary work.

Works

Novels
Y todos éramos actores, un siglo de luz y sombra [And All of Us Were Actors, A Century Of Light And Shadow] (2016)
English edition translated by Andrea G. Labinger (March 2017). The novel obtained second place of the ILBA (International Latino Book Award 2018) in the category Best Fiction Book in Translation - Spanish to English.[2]  
 It Was A Time To Dream (1992)
Second edition, digital and paperback: It Was Time To Dream Of The Pregnant Birdies (2016)
And The Earth Was Round (1993)
Second edition, digital and paperback: And The Earth Was Round (2016)
Ado’s Plot of Land (2002)
Second edition, digital and paperback (2016)
An Ordinary Murder

Theatre
The Land Of Tears Of Blood or We Call You Chile Freedom (1978)
 Premiered in Paris and performed at the Avignon and Nancy International festivals, and throughout France. 
Columbus’ Egg or Coca-Cola Offers You A Journey Of Dreams In Latin America (1982)
 Premiered at the Gérard Philipe Theatre, Champigny-sur-Marne, France, performed in the Hall of Honor of the UNESCO, Paris, and throughout France, at several international festivals such as Carrefour de l’Europe, Hammamet, Djendouba, Tabarka, Hammam Lift, Bern, Manizales, Rotterdam, Sategedoor Festival, San Juan Puerto Rico and Manizales. A one year tour in Colombia. 
Gonzalito or Yesterday I Learned That I Can Return (1989)
 Premiered in Rotterdam, the Netherlands, at the Latino Festival of Utrecht. 
Five Sighs of Eternity (1992) 
Discoverings (1992)
 Premiered at the Texas Christian University, 1992

Novella
Dalibá, The Witch Of The Caribbean (1984)

Poetry

 hombre de américa/man of the americas (Nueva York Poetry Press, 2022)
 deseos   longings   j'aimerais tant (Ediciones Nuevo Espacio, 2020) trilingual poetry collection
Ex-Iliads (1989)

Chronicle 

 Esperando la revolución: Cuba: crónicas de un viaje inconcluso (2019)
 Waiting for the Revolution: Cuba: The Unfinished Journey (2019)

Collection of op eds 
Navegando los tiempos de la peste: Coronavirus 2020 (collection of op eds on the Coronavirus crisis)

Links to recent publications or Poetry Readings: 
Gustavo Gac-Artigas, Fundación Neruda

Gustavo Gac-Artigas, Revista Altazor

Latino Book Review

Revista Literaria "Taller Igitur" Feb. 2023

Poetry Readings 
Poetry Reading. XV Festival Internacional Poetas del Mundo, Chiapas 

Bilingual  recital French-Spanish in Paris 2022

Fragmentos: La obra en la voz del autor 12 different poetry or prose readings

College textbooks
To The Point: a complete reference manual for Spanish grammar (Prentice Hall, College Division, 1999)
Sans détour: a complete reference manual for French grammar (Prentice Hall, College Division, 1999)
Roadmap To The Culture And Civilization Of Latin America (Academic Press Jan, 2006, sixth ed. 2012
E-GPS mobile application essay / essay: A comprehensive App designed to guide students through the writing of the Most Frequently Requested types of essays: argumentative, expository, compare and contrast and literary commentaries in two languages, English and Spanish, all in one App. It Works with the same principle of a GPS: to guide towards independence. Once students have internalized the structural patterns of the essays, they will be able to reproduce them automatically within any context. (For iOS and Android). ENE Academic Press, 2015.

Anthologies
Anthology Of Songs Of Struggle And Hope. Editorial Quimantú, Chile (1973). Co-author: Perla Valencia

Opinion Articles 
Navegando los tiempos de la peste: Coronavirus 2020 (collection of op eds on the Coronavirus crisis)
 The Presidential Debate in the US, hurry, tickets are selling out! El debate presidencial en los EE.UU., apurarse que se están acabando los boletos
 USA, Elections 2016: The End of Democracy?
 When Saying “Nous Sommes Paris” Is Not Enough
 The Irresistible Rise of Donald Trump 
Regular op-ed contributor to Agencia Efe, Le Monde diplomatique, Chile edition, Impactolatino.com https://impactolatino.com/results/?q=Gustavo+Gac-Artigas since 2015

Reception
deseos  longings  j'aimerais tant:  Latino Book Review, Letralia, Todoliteratura

Severo Sarduy, about his first novel, It Was A Time To Dream: “Imaginative writing of extreme theatricality and fiction (based on historical facts sometimes recognizable) that make text one halogen,
Edith Grossman, about his second novel, "E il orbo era rondo": “I was really impressed by the superposition of different time periods, the interpenetration of the historical, the mythological and the surreal. A difficult but valuable book, closer to an epic poem than to a novel.” 

About And All of Us Were Actors, A Century of Light and Shadow.

Gac-Artigas' plays have been performed in 18 international theater festivals:
 World Festival of Nancy (France, 1975)
 Avignon Festival (France, 1975, 1980)
 Festival Ljubljana (Yugoslavia, 1980)
 Festival of Bern (Switzerland, 1980)
 Festival Zurich (Switzerland, 1980)
 Festival of Yverdon (Switzerland, 1981, 1983)
 Festival of Hammamet (Tunisia, 1982)
 Djendouba Festival (Tunisia, 1982)
 Festival of Tabarka (Tunisia, 1982)
 Hammam-Lif Festival (Tunisia, 1982)
 Carrefour de l’Europe (France, 1983, 1984)
 VII International Festival of Manizales (Colombia, 1985)
 Stagedoor Festival (Netherlands, 1986)
 Latino Festival in Utrecht (Netherlands, 1989)
 XXVII International Festival of the Instituto de Cultura Puertorriqueña (San Juan, Puerto Rico, 1991)

References

1944 births
Chilean male novelists
Chilean male dramatists and playwrights
Hispanic and Latino American writers
Living people
20th-century Chilean dramatists and playwrights
20th-century Chilean male writers
21st-century Chilean dramatists and playwrights
21st-century Chilean male writers
20th-century Chilean novelists
21st-century Chilean novelists